Armando Dal Chiele (born 11 February 1959) is a former international speedway rider from Italy.

Speedway career 
Dal Chiele reached the final of the Speedway World Pairs Championship three times from 1984 until 1992.

He rode in the top tier of British Speedway from 1982 to 1991, riding for Birmingham Brummies and King's Lynn Stars.

World Final appearances

World Pairs Championship
 1984 -  Lonigo, Pista Speedway (with Armando Castagna) - 7th - 6pts
 1989 -  Leszno, Alfred Smoczyk Stadium (with Valentino Furlanetto) - 8th - 15pts
 1992 -  Lonigo, Pista Speedway (with Valentino Furlanetto / Armando Castagna) - 4th - 18pts

References 

1959 births
Italian speedway riders
King's Lynn Stars riders
Birmingham Brummies riders
Sportspeople from the Province of Vicenza
Living people